Chen Daqi (1886–1983), or Ch'en Ta-ch'i, was a psychologist, philosopher, politician, and writer. He was a pioneer of modern psychology in China. Chen was a former President of Zhejiang University, and acting President of Peking University.

Biography

Chen was born in Haiyan County, Zhejiang Province in 1886. His courtesy name was Bainian (百年). Chen finished his elementary study in a local school of his hometown, and studied English in Shanghai. In 1901, Chen entered Zhejiang Qiushi Academy (current Zhejiang University) in Hangzhou. In 1903, Chen went to study in Japan. Chen first studied in Sendai, but later entered the Tokyo Imperial University (now the University of Tokyo). Chen studied philosophy, majored in psychology, and graduated BA in 1912.

In 1912, Chen went back to China after graduation. From 1912 to 1913, Chen was the president of Zhejiang Advanced College (浙江高等学校; current Zhejiang University) in Hangzhou. Chen was also a professor of Zhejiang School of Law and Politics (浙江(私立)法政专门学校).

Chen was a strong supporter of May Fourth Movement. He was also a close friend of Lu Xun.

From 1922 to 1927, Chen was a professor, the head of the Department of Philosophy of Peking University in Beijing. From 1927 to Jan 1928, Chen was the Provost of Peking University. From 6 Nov 1928 to 30 Dec 1929, Chen was the Secretary-general of the Examination Yuan of the Central Government of ROC. In 1929, Chen was the dean of the arts faculty of Peking University. From 1929 to Jan 1931, Chen was the acting President of Peking University. From 10 Dec 1930 to 22 Dec 1932 and from 10 to 27 Jan 1942, Chen served the Secretary-general of Examination Yuan. In Jul 1948, Chen start serving as a senior advisor of national policy for government.

After 1949, Chen went to Taiwan. Chen served the first President of National Chengchi University (NCCU) from Oct 1954 to Jul 1959. In Apr 1964, Chen became the first Director-general of the Confucius-Mencius Society (孔孟学会) in Taipei at the Nanhai Academy.

Chen died in Taiwan on 8 Jan 1983.

Works

Chen was an influential educator, writer, educator, Confucian philosopher and psychologist. Chen published more than 20 monographs. His A General Outline of Psychology (心理学大纲, 1918, Commercial Press) is the first modern textbook of psychology in China. Chen also translated many German psychological works, thus he was also a well-known translator.

References

External links
 Chen Daqi - President of Zhejiang University (in Chinese, including photo)
 Chen Daqi's brief biography from Zhejiang University

1886 births
1983 deaths
19th-century Chinese translators
20th-century Chinese translators
Chinese psychologists
Educators from Jiaxing
Academic staff of Peking University
Philosophers from Zhejiang
Politicians from Jiaxing
Republic of China philosophers
Republic of China politicians from Zhejiang
Republic of China translators
Translators from German
Translators to Chinese
University of Tokyo alumni
Writers from Jiaxing
Zhejiang University alumni
Academic staff of Zhejiang University
20th-century psychologists